Posht Tang-e Chameshk (also known as Chameshk-e Posht-e Tang) is a village in Miyankuh-e Sharqi Rural District, Mamulan District, Pol-e Dokhtar County, Lorestan Province, Iran. At the 2006 census, its population was 63, in 13 families.

References 

Towns and villages in Pol-e Dokhtar County